Yersinia massiliensis is a Gram-negative bacteria that is commonly isolated from the environment and food. The type strain is CCUG 53443 (=CIP 109351 =DSM 21859).

Etymology
Yersinia massiliensis, mas.si.li.en’sis N.L. masc./fem. adj. massiliensis, pertaining to Massilia, the ancient Roman name of Marseille, France, where the type strain was isolated.

References

External links
LPSN: Species Yersinia massiliensis

massiliensis
Bacteria described in 2008